Home and Away is an Australian soap opera first broadcast on the Seven Network on 17 January 1988. The following is a list of characters that first appeared in 2001, by order of first appearance. They were all introduced by the show's then executive producer John Holmes. The 14th season of Home and Away began airing on 15 January 2001 The first introduction of the year was Alex Poulos in February. Sam Atwell joined the cast as Kane Phillips on 9 April, Kane's brother Scott debuted in the following episode. June saw the respective arrivals of Seb Miller and Flynn Saunders. Stephanie Chaves-Jacobsen began playing doctor Charlotte Adams in September. November saw Daniel Collopy join the cast as Josh West and two births occurred; VJ Patterson and Lily Smith.

Alex Poulos 

Alexi "Alex" Poulos', portrayed by Danny Raco, made his first on screen appearance on 26 February 2001 and departed in 2004. Raco returned for a brief guest stint in 2007 and made his final appearance on 19 June 2007. Raco joined the cast in 2001 and his first scenes began airing on 26 February 2001. He quit the serial in late 2003 to pursue a career in directing and his final scenes aired in early 2004.  For his portrayal of Alex, Raco was nominated for Most Popular New Male Talent at the 2002 Logie Awards.

Kane Phillips

Scott Phillips 

Scott Phillips, played by Nathaniel Dean, made his first appearance on-screen during the episode airing on 10 April 2001. When the character returned in 2003, Josh Rosenthal took over the role and Scott made his final appearance on 23 February 2005.

Scott is Kane Phillips' (Sam Atwell) older brother. He begins menacing Nick Smith (Chris Egan) when he damages his motorbike and demands $200. When Jude Lawson (Ben Steel) is accused of beating Kane up for harassing his girlfriend Shauna Bradley (Kylie Watson), Scott attacks him. Scott and Kane then kidnap Shauna and a police siege ensues and Shauna is freed and Scott is jailed.

Two years later, Scott is released and returns to Summer Bay. It emerges that he and Kane were involved in a service station robbery and held Tasha Andrews (Isabel Lucas) hostage.
When Scott comes to reclaim the money, Kane tells him it burned up in the Drop-in centre fire but he refuses to believe him and threatens to harm Tasha. Scott then attempts to kidnap Tasha
but is quickly foiled. He then holds Flynn Saunders (Joel McIlroy) at gunpoint in his surgery but Flynn overpowers him. Scott then trashes the old Hunter farm and flees the Bay.

Scott reappears in February 2005 when Kane visits him in prison after learning their father Gus (Peter Lamb) visited Scott, revealing details of the robbery he framed Kane for. Scott refuses to tell him anything at first but agrees as long as Kane's lawyer Morag Bellingham (Cornelia Frances) helps him with his own upcoming appeal. Kane stands trial and Scott is called as a witness but immediately lies on the stand, claiming Kane asked him to lie under oath, destroying Kane's defence.

Seb Miller

Flynn Saunders 

Flynn Saunders, played by Martin Dingle-Wall, made his first appearance on 13 July 2001. Dingle-Wall quit the serial in 2002 and was subsequently replaced by Joel McIlroy in 2003. The character departed following his death on 13 February 2006. The episode featuring Flynn's death won writer, Sam Miekle, the Australian Writers' Guild Award for "Best Episode in a Television Serial" in 2006. For their portrayals of Flynn, Dingle-Wall and McIlroy were nominated for "Most Popular New Male Talent" and "Most Popular Actor" at the 2002 and 2006 Logie Award ceremonies, respectively. Flynn's death was voted the second most gripping storyline in a TV Week reader's poll in December 2006. McIlroy's portrayal of Flynn earned him three nominations at the 2006 Inside Soap Awards in the respective categories of "Best Actor", "Best Couple" alongside Co-star Ritchie, and "Best Storyline" for Flynn's death.

Josh West 

Josh West, played by Daniel Collopy, debuted on-screen during late 2001 and departed in 2003. He returned in late 2005 where Josh tried to develop a freeway through town and subsequently became mayor of Summer Bay. He was later accidentally killed in early 2006.
In September 2001, Collopy successfully auditioned for the role of Josh and moved from Melbourne to Sydney to begin filming. Josh was Collopy's first regular television role and he felt it was a "fantastic opportunity" to work on Home and Away.
Network Seven describe Josh as being part of a "high-society family" and initially being "about as laid-back as they come".  Collopy was written out of the serial when Josh is murdered in a whodunit storyline. The serial's producers wanted to capitalise on the success of their stalker storyline, which pulled in high viewing figures, by creating a new mystery plot. For his portrayal of Josh, Collopy was nominated for the "Most Popular New Male Talent" Logie Award in 2003. Collopy was nominated for "Best Bad Boy" at the 2006 Inside Soap Awards. Michael Idato of the said that Josh was the "new hottie" in Summer Bay and credited Josh's on-screen romance as transforming Collopy into the "No 1. TV Week coverboy".

VJ Patterson 

Vincent "VJ" Patterson, Jr., played by Felix Dean, made his first screen appearance during the episode broadcast on 30 November 2001.  From his introduction, VJ has been played by eleven different child actors. These include Carlo Teodorowych, Jack Monger, Max Theoharis, Marcus Spinetti, Jack Riddle, Harry Roberts, James Roberts, Nicholas Stevens, Cameron Stevens and Cooper Scott. Felix Dean was cast in the role in 2007.
For his portrayal of VJ, Dean has been nominated for Best Young Actor at the 2008 and 2009 Inside Soap Awards. VJ's name has been a source of amusement to some critics, with one calling him "unfortunately named" and another believing that he was named after an "early model Holden".

Lily Smith 

Lily Smith (née Nash) made her first appearance on 30 November 2001, following her birth. She was played by Harriet Tapley and Simone Medici. Twins Claudia and Olivia Jenkins assumed the role of Lily for one episode in 2003 and when the character returned to the serial in 2010, she was portrayed by Charlie Rose MacLennan. MacLennan began appearing as Lily from 14 October. She commented that she was initially starstruck when she first arrived on the set, saying "I knew everyone's face and I expected them to be exactly like their characters, but they're definitely not."

Lily is born to Gypsy Nash (Kimberley Cooper) and Will Smith (Zac Drayson) when their car breaks on a roadside down en route to Northern Districts Hospital and Will delivers Lily. Will and Gypsy marry in a ceremony on the beach before they leave Summer Bay for Queensland. Lily is seen again when her uncle Nick (Chris Egan) visits Will in Queensland after being accused of assaulting Angie Russell (Laurie Foell). Lily gains a sister when her parents adopt Rachel McGregor (Sara Mumcu) who has been living with them for a while.

Lily returns with Will to visit Irene Roberts (Lynne McGranger) and she is happy to see them. Will reveals the reason for this visit; his marriage to Gypsy has broken down following his infidelity with another woman. When Will's reconciliation with Gypsy fails, he trashes the Beach House, to Lily's fright. Lily meets VJ Patterson (Felix Dean), who was born on the same day as her and they make a plan to run away to see Elijah Johnson (Jay Laga'aia) in Africa. Along the way to the airport they are picked up by hitch-hiker Gary (Keith Agus) who gives them a lift but they get frightened when he suggests they go to his house first and run away. VJ and Lily are found by detectives Robert Robertson (Socrattis Otto) and Detective Graves (Eryn-Jean Norvill) and return to their respective parents Leah Patterson-Baker (Ada Nicodemou) and Will. Lily falls ill and Will takes her away from the bay but Irene encourages him to bring her back. Lily falls sicker and Will tells Irene to look after her but is arrested before he can get away. When Will is revealed as Penn Graham's (Christian Clark) killer, he is remanded in custody and Lily is returned to Gypsy.

Lily and Gypsy return several months later to visit Irene following her cancer diagnosis and help look after her. Gypsy's new boyfriend  Mark Gilmour (Shane Emmett) arrives and it is clear that he and Lily do not get on very well.  Mark later suggests sending Lily to boarding school, but Gypsy disagrees with the idea. Gypsy and Mark's relationship ends after Lily learns Gypsy had sex with Liam Murphy (Axel Whitehead) and tells Mark. Irene tells Gypsy to leave and she and Lily return to Queensland.

Others

References

External links 
 Characters and cast at the Official AU Home and Away website
 Characters and cast at the Official UK Home and Away website
 Characters and cast at the Internet Movie Database

, 2001
, Home and Away